The 1982 South Carolina Gamecocks football team represented the University of South Carolina as an independent during the 1982 NCAA Division I-A football season. Led by Richard Bell in his first and only season as head coach, the Gamecocks compiled a record of 4–7.

Schedule

References

South Carolina
South Carolina Gamecocks football seasons
South Carolina Gamecocks football